Rani is a Pakistani political drama serial directed by Angeline Malik and written by Naseem Mukri, from the Dhadkan fame.

Plot
It is about a journey of a woman from innocence to a political position mostly meant for men in a male-dominated Pakistan. It is about greed, power, politics, revenge and women empowerment.

Cast
 Mikaal Zulfiqar
 Sarwat Gillani as Rani
 Sajid Hasan
 Seemi Raheel
 Imran Arooj
 Farooq Zameer
 Durdana Butt as Rani's mother

References

Pakistani drama television series
Urdu-language television shows
Pakistan Television Corporation original programming